Mikaël Cherel (born 17 March 1986) is a French professional road bicycle racer, who currently rides for UCI WorldTeam .

Major results

2003
 1st  Road race, National Junior Road Championships
 8th Road race, UCI Junior Road World Championships
2004
 1st Overall Trophée Centre Morbihan Juniors
2005
 10th Liège–Bastogne–Liège Espoirs
2008
 10th Overall La Tropicale Amissa Bongo
 10th Overall Paris–Corrèze
2009
 10th Overall Tour Down Under
2010
 5th Overall Paris–Corrèze
2011
 5th Polynormande
 9th Overall Tour du Limousin
2012
 8th Grand Prix d'Ouverture La Marseillaise
2013
 5th Polynormande
 8th Coppa Sabatini
2014
 6th Overall Tour du Haut Var
 6th La Drôme Classic
 8th Boucles de l'Aulne
 10th Overall Tour of Beijing
2016
 4th Overall La Méditerranéenne
 6th Overall Tour du Haut Var
2017
 6th Grand Prix d'Ouverture La Marseillaise

Grand Tour general classification results timeline

References

External links

 
  Mikael Cherel profile at Cycling Quotient
 Mikael Cherel profile at Ag2r La Mondiale Team

French male cyclists
1986 births
Living people
Sportspeople from Manche
Rennes 2 University alumni
Cyclists from Normandy